

1978

See also
1978 in the Soviet Union

External links
 Soviet films of 1978 at the Internet Movie Database

1978
Soviet
Films